Usarufa is a Kainantu language spoken by the people of the same name in Papua New Guinea. It belongs to the Gauwa branch of the Kainantu family of the Kainantu–Goroka languages.  The language area consists of six villages: Moife, Imikori, Irafo, Kagu, Agura 1, and Agura 2.  Its ISO 639 code is usa.

As of 2009, the language was reported to have had about 1200 speakers and no fluent speakers below the age of 25, which makes it an endangered language.

See also
Vida Chenoweth, who studied the Usarufa music
Aikuma, mobile software for language recording, first used to record Usarufa

References

External links
 
 OLAC Resources in and about the Usarufa Language
 
 Paradisec has a collection of Stephen A Wurm's materials (SAW3) that include Usarufa materials.

Kainantu–Goroka languages
Endangered languages of Oceania
Languages of Eastern Highlands Province
Endangered Papuan languages